The Cabinet Room is the meeting room for the officials and advisors to the president of the United States who constitute the Cabinet of the United States. The room is located in the West Wing of the White House, adjoining the Oval Office, and looks out upon the White House Rose Garden.

Though completed in 1934, the room is built in the Georgian style. The neoclassical ceiling molding with triglyphs was installed in 1934. A series of French doors topped with arched lunette windows are located on the east side of the room. The light switch can be found on the wall, to the right by said doors. A fireplace, flanked by two niches is located on the north side of the room. Busts of George Washington and Benjamin Franklin by Jean-Antoine Houdon fill the niches. Above the mantel hangs a painting titled The Signing of the Declaration of Independence by Charles Édouard Armand-Dumaresq, (French, 1826–1895). Additional portraits along the west wall are chosen by an incumbent president. The large elliptical mahogany table was a gift from President Richard Nixon in 1970. The president and the cabinet secretaries' chairs are copies of a late-eighteenth century design. The president's chair is centered on the table on the east side of the room. The back of the president's chair is two inches taller than those of the cabinet secretaries. Engraved brass plates with the names of the cabinet positions are attached to the back of the chairs. The president's simply says "THE PRESIDENT." The chairs may be purchased by the cabinet members upon leaving office, in case they wish to keep the chair as a souvenir. Some cabinet members have had their chairs returned to the cabinet room for several positions and administrations.

In 2006, the room was refurbished somewhat similarly to its appearance during the administration of Franklin Delano Roosevelt when the West Wing and current Cabinet Room were largely rebuilt following damages from a fire at the end of the Herbert Hoover administration. This includes Art Deco style wall sconces with spread eagles supporting internally lit globes. Three overhead Moderne style glass pendant lights were recreated from old photographs and a similar surviving example in a hallway between the Oval Office and Roosevelt Room. The room is painted an off-white color called deauville. A custom made carpet, in shades of carmine, old gold, sapphire and fern green with a pattern of overscaled stars and olive leaves was woven for the room.

The refurbishment of White House rooms is jointly undertaken by the Curator of the White House, the Committee for the Preservation of the White House, and White House Historical Association. Costs relating to construction are often funded by the White House Endowment Trust. The purchase of fine art, historic furniture, or the recreation of period decorative arts, is frequently paid for by the White House Acquisition Trust.

References

Further reading 
 Abbott James A., and Elaine M. Rice. Designing Camelot: The Kennedy White House Restoration. Van Nostrand Reinhold: 1998. .
 Garrett, Wendell. Our Changing White House. Northeastern University Press: 1995. .
 Kloss. William, Doreen Bolger, David Park Curry, et al. Art in the White House, A Nation's Pride, White House Historical Association and Harry Abrams: 1992. .
 Monkman, Betty C. The White House: The Historic Furnishing & First Families. Abbeville Press: 2000. .
 Seale, William. The President's House. White House Historical Association and the National Geographic Society: 1986. .
 Seale, William, The White House: The History of an American Idea. White House Historical Association: 1992, 2001. .
 The White House: An Historic Guide. White House Historical Association and the National Geographic Society: 2006. .

External links

White House curator Bill Allman describes the recent refurbishment
Cabinet Room historic photo essay
White House website description of Cabinet Room
The online White House museum page

Rooms in the White House
Articles containing video clips